Friends of Vietnam Heritage (FVH) is a non-profit educational group dedicated to preserving and understanding Vietnam's culture. Established in Hanoi by citizens of many countries.

Activities
 Study groups on topics of history or related fields.
 Study tours to historical and cultural sites, craft villages and other sites related to everyday life.
 Lectures and events on heritage culture and life in Vietnam
 Collection and maintenance of books and reference materials on Vietnamese heritage and culture to support the FVH study groups.

The organization has authored several books.

Publications

 Trá̂n Quó̂c Pagoda Hanoi, Friends of Vietnam heritage, Sulekha Kumar, Tini Ngo Thien Huong, The Gioi Publishers, 2006. 
 Traditional medicine street: Phó̂ Lãn Óng, Hà Nội, Thế Giới Publishers (Hanoi, Vietnam), Friends of Vietnam Heritage, 2005. 
 Vignettes of French culture in Hanoi, Friends of Vietnam Heritage, Thé̂ Giới Publishers, 2008 
 Bát Tràng, traditional pottery village: a self-guided walk, Friends of Vietnam Heritage, Thế Giới Publishers, 2006

References

External links
FVH Home Page

This article is related to the List of non-governmental organizations in Vietnam.

Cultural organizations based in Vietnam